Aplocheilus blockii or the green panchax is a species of fish native to waters around India, Sri Lanka, and Pakistan.

Description 
Aplocheilus blockii measures 6 centimeters long. It frequently inhabits coastal habitats that either contain brackish water or fresh water. It feeds on larvae, insects, and fish fry.

Name
This species was described by the German aquarist  in 1911 with a type locality given as Cochim, India. The specific name honours a Captain Block who was responsible for importing this fish into Germany.

References 

blocki
Fish of India
Fish of Sri Lanka
Fish of Pakistan
Fish described in 1911